('in the middle') in Native Hawaiian and Tahitian cultures are third gender people with traditional spiritual and social roles within the culture, similar to Tongan  and Samoan . Historically māhū were assigned male at birth (AMAB), but in modern usage māhū can refer to a variety of genders and sexual orientations.

According to present-day māhū kumu hula Kaua'i Iki:

In modern popular culture, māhū is commonly used pejoratively of LGBTQ people.

History

According to some, in the pre-colonial history of Hawai'i, māhū were notable priests and healers, although much of this history was elided through the intervention of missionaries. Others describe the māhū as not having access to political power, being unable to aspire to leadership roles, and "Perceived as always available for sexual conquest by men." The first published description of māhū occurs in Captain William Bligh's logbook of the Bounty, which stopped in Tahiti in 1789, where he was introduced to a member of  a "class of people very common in Otaheitie called Mahoo... who although I was certain was a man, had great marks of effeminacy about him." 

A surviving monument to this history are the "Wizard Stones" of Kapaemāhū on Waikiki Beach, which commemorate four important māhū who first brought the healing arts from Tahiti to Hawaiʻi.  These are referred to by Hawaiian historian Mary Kawena Pukui as pae māhū, or literally a row of māhū.  The term māhū is misleadingly defined in Pukui and Ebert's Hawaiian dictionary as "n. Homosexual, of either sex; hermaphrodite." The assumption of same-sex behavior reflects the conflation of gender and sexuality that was common at that time. The idea that māhū are biological mosaics appears to be a misunderstanding of the term hermaphrodite, which in early publications by sexologists and anthropologists was used generally to mean "an individual which has the attributes of both male and female," including social and behavioral attributes, not necessarily a biological hybrid or intersex individual. This led to homosexual, bisexual, and gender nonconforming individuals being mislabeled as "hermaphrodites" in the medical literature.

Kaomi Moe, aikāne to King Kamehameha III and a māhū, is another historical example. 

In 1891, when painter Paul Gauguin first came to Tahiti, he was thought to be a māhū by the indigenous people, due to his flamboyant manner of dress during that time.  His 1893 painting Papa Moe (Mysterious Water) depicts a māhū drinking from a small waterfall.

Missionaries to Hawai'i introduced biblical laws to the islands in the 1820s; under their influence Hawai'i's first anti-sodomy law was passed in 1850. These laws led to the social stigmatization of the māhū in Hawai'i. Beginning in the mid-1960s the Honolulu City Council required trans women to wear a badge identifying themselves as male.

In American artist George Biddle's Tahitian Journal (1920–1922) he writes about several māhū friends in Tahiti, of their role in native Tahitian society, and of the persecution of a māhū friend Naipu, who fled Tahiti due to colonial French laws that sent māhū and homosexuals to hard labor in prison in New Caledonia.  Rae rae is a social category of māhū that came into use in Tahiti in the 1960s, although it is criticized by some māhū as an abject reference to sex.

In contemporary cultures

In the 1980s, māhū and fa'afafine of Samoa and other queer cultures of the Pacific began organizing, as māhū and queer Pacific Islanders were beginning to receive international recognition in various fields.

In 2003, the term mahuwahine was coined within Hawaii's queer community: māhū (in the middle) + wahine (woman), the structure of the word is similar to Samoan fa'a (the way of) + fafine (woman/wife). The term mahuwahine resembles a transgender identity that coincides with Hawaiian cultural renaissance. Kumu Hinaleimoana Kwai Kong Wong-Kalu clarified that:"Since the term māhū can have multiple spaces and experiences, Kumu Hina originally coined the terms: māhū kāne (transgender man) and māhū wahine (transgender woman). However, Kumu Hina believes that those terms should be revised due to scientific advancement and so she coined four new terms. Māhū who feel internally wahine (female) — emotionally, spiritually, psychologically and culturally — could use the term haʻawahine. If they feel more internally that they are kāne (men), they are haʻakāne. When they have taken on externally what they feel internally i.e. dressing as a female, have began to or had undergone hormone therapy and other forms of medical transitioning (including cosmetic surgery), then the term hoʻowahine would be used. Likewise, for māhū who feel that they are internally male and taking that form externally, then hoʻokāne. ..."Notable contemporary , or mahuwahine, include activist and kumu hula Hinaleimoana Kwai Kong Wong-Kalu, kumu hula Kaumakaiwa Kanaka'ole, and kumu hula Kaua'i Iki; and within the wider māhū LGBT community, historian Noenoe Silva, activist Ku‘u-mealoha Gomes, singer and painter Bobby Holcomb, and singer Kealii Reichel.

In many traditional communities, māhū play an important role in carrying on Polynesian culture, and teaching "the balance of female and male throughout creation". Modern māhū carry on traditions of connection to the land, language preservation, and the preservation and revival of cultural activities including traditional dances, songs, and the methods of playing culturally-specific musical instruments. Symbolic tattooing is also a popular practice. Modern māhū do not alter their bodies through what others would consider gender reassignment surgery, but just as any person in Hawaiian/Tahitian society dress differently for work, home, and nights out.

Strong familial relationships are important in māhū culture, as kinship bonds within all of Hawaiian/Tahitian cultures are essential to family survival. When possible, the māhū maintain solid relationships with their families of origin, often by becoming foster parents to nieces and nephews, and have been noted for being especially "compassionate, and creative". This ability to bring up children is considered a special skill specific to māhū people. Māhū also contribute to their extended families and communities through the gathering and maintaining of knowledge, and the practicing and teaching of hula traditions, which are traditionally handed down through women.

In situations where they have been rejected by their families of origin, due to homophobia and colonization, māhū have formed their own communities, supporting one another, and preserving and teaching cultural traditions to the next generations. In the documentary Kumu Hina, Hinaleimoana Wong-Kalu visits one of these communities of elders up in the mountains, and meets with some of the māhū who were her teachers and chosen family when she was young.

See also 
Hinaleimoana Wong-Kalu – contemporary , teacher and Hawaiian cultural worker
Kumu Hina (2014) – documentary film about Hinaleimoana Wong-Kalu
LGBT rights in Hawaii
Rae-rae
Fa’afafine, similar group in Samoa and American Samoa
Bakla, similar third gender concept in the Philippines
Bissu, similar third gender concept among the Bugis people of Indonesia
Two-spirit, a pan-Indian umbrella term for all traditional Native American identities that do not fit into the Western gender binary or heterosexual roles

Footnotes

References and sources

Eisenman, Stephen F., (1999). Gauguin's Skirt. London: Thames and Hudson. .
Matzner, Andrew (2001). O Au No Keia: Voices from Hawai'i's Mahu and Transgender Communities

External links
Kumu Hina: A Place in the Middle – a -oriented website.
"Coming Out & Overcoming – A Visit With Hinaleimoana Wong" – interview with  Hinaleimoana Wong, by Ehu Kekahu Cardwell, from Voices of Truth documentary program by the Koani Foundation
"The Beautiful Way Hawaiian Culture Embraces a Particular Kind of Transgender Identity" – short "Queer Voices" column on the topic in The Huffington Post

LGBT Native Hawaiian culture
Native Hawaiian culture
Gender systems
Third gender
Transgender in Oceania
Transgender in the United States
Indigenous LGBT culture